The 2023–24 Swiss Super League (referred to as the Credit Suisse Super League for sponsoring reasons) is the 127th season of top-tier competitive football in Switzerland and the 21st under its current name. It will be the first season under its current name featuring twelve teams (increased from ten in previous season) and a new format.

Overview

Format
Since rebranding and restructuring the National League A to the Super League, starting with the 2003–04 season, the league has been running under the same format and the same number of teams. This season will thus be the first season of the Super League under a new format. It also returns to having twelve teams in the highest Swiss football tier.

The season is divided into two phases: 
 In a first phase all twelve teams play each other three times each, for a total of 33 matchdays.
 Following that, the league is split into two groups of six each, one Championship Group and one Relegation Group.
 Each team will play every other team in their group one time (five matches each), for a total of 38 matchdays. 
 The Championship Group will play for the title of Swiss Football Champion and qualification to European championships.
 The Relegation Group will play against relegation (last place) and qualification to the relegation play-off (second-to-last place).
 Points won in the first phase are carried over to the second phase.

Teams
Due to the increased number of teams, no teams were directly relegated at the end of the 2022–23 season and two teams were directly promoted from the Challenge League.

Schedule
The Swiss Football League (SFL) released a detail schedule on 7 December 2022. The season will begin on 22 July 2023 and conclude on 25 May 2024. As before, the league will go on winter break after matchday 18 on 17 December 2023 and resume on 20 January 2024. 

The first phase will conclude with matchday 33 on 21 April 2024 and the second phase will start two weeks later, on 4 May 2024. The final matchday of the Relegation Group will take place on 21 May 2024, while the Championship Group will hold its last matches on 25 May 2024. The two legs of the relegation play-offs are scheduled for 26 and 31 May 2024, respectively.

References

External links
Official website
uefa.com 
soccerway.com 

Swiss Super League seasons
2023–24 in Swiss football
Swit
Switzerland